The York Arms is an historic building in the English city of York, North Yorkshire. It was designed by James Pigott Pritchett. Part of a seven-unit row (24–36 High Petergate) that is a Grade II listed structure dating to 1838, it faces south at 26 High Petergate. These units are sandwiched between early-18th-century properties. The rear of the properties to the north, on Precentor's Court, are also part of the listing. They were originally residences for canons of the adjacent York Minster.

High Petergate elevation
The southern side, on High Petergate, is a seven-unit terrace. The York Arms occupied number 26. It closed in the summer of 2019 and became involved in a High Court legal action.

Frontage detail

Precentor's Court elevation
John Knowles, a lodging-house keeper, was living at 1 Precentor's Court, on the northern side of the properties, in 1872. Peter Gibson, a glazier who worked on all of the Minster's stained-glass windows, lived at 1 Precentor's Court for almost all of his 87 years. "I live here, and I look out of the window, and there it is, the Minster. It is one of the greatest buildings in the world," he said. "People cross oceans, cross the world, to come and see it."

Frontage detail

References

Houses in North Yorkshire
1838 establishments in England
Grade II listed buildings in York
Grade II listed pubs in York
Grade II listed houses